Rhoda Haas Goldman (1924 – February 17, 1996) was an American billionaire philanthropist in San Francisco, California.

Biography
Goldman was the only daughter born to Walter A. Haas and Elise Stern (heiress to the Levi Strauss fortune); and granddaughter of David Stern. 

She was a graduate of the University of California, Berkeley and, in 1946, she married fellow Berkeley alumnus Richard Goldman. In 1951, the couple founded the Richard and Rhoda Goldman Fund, a foundation that has donated over $680 million to various organizations. 

The Goldman School of Public Policy at Berkeley is named after the Goldmans.

She served as president of the San Francisco Symphony, chairwoman of San Francisco's Memorial to the Six Million Victims of the Holocaust, director of the Mount Zion Health System, president of the Mount Zion Hospital and Medical Center, and president of Congregation Emanu-El, the city's largest reform Jewish synagogue.

She was a major supporter of environmental causes and San Francisco arts organizations and a co-founder with her husband of the Goldman Environment Prize in 1990.

Personal life
She had four children with her husband: John D. Goldman, Douglas E. Goldman, Susan R. Gelman, and Richard Goldman (deceased). Her grandson, son of Richard, is attorney Daniel S. Goldman. Funeral services were held at Congregation Emanu-El in San Francisco.

References

External links
Finding Aid for the Richard N. and Rhoda H. Goldman papers, 1863-2003, The Bancroft Library

1924 births
1996 deaths
American philanthropists
Jewish American philanthropists
People from San Francisco
Haas family
University of California, Berkeley alumni